Lam Tei is an area in the Tuen Mun District of the New Territories, Hong Kong. The region lies at the north end of Tuen Mun city. It is highly rural, with Miu Fat Buddhist Monastery being a landmark of the region.

History
Several villages of the Lam Tei area were established by the To Clan. Originally from Poyang, Jiangxi (other sources mention Watlam in Guangxi), the To Clan moved to Ngau Tam Mei and then to Tuen Mun Tai Tsuen. Following the increase of the clan population, the village dispersed and developed into five villages in the Lam Tei area: Nai Wai, Tsing Chuen Wai, Tuen Tsz Wai, Lam Tei Tsuen and Tuen Mun San Tsuen, which were all fortified.

Features
Features of the area include:
 Miu Fat Buddhist Monastery
 Several walled villages: Chung Uk Tsuen, Lam Tei Tsuen, Nai Wai, Sun Fung Wai, Tsing Chuen Wai, Tuen Tsz Wai, Tuen Mun San Tsuen
 Residential estates, including The Sherwood and Botania Villa
 Lam Tei Quarry
 Lam Tei Reservoir
 Hung Shui Hang Reservoir
 The Old To Ancestral Hall (陶氏宗祠) (pictured) in Tuen Tsz Wai was briefly used by the Japanese Army during the Second World War. The commander later moved the base elsewhere, after discovering the origins of the Clan tracing back to To Yuan Ming. The Old To Ancestral Hall later caught fire after the war, when the interior was rented out as a storage space for cargo. The To Clan later invested in a New Ancestral Hall, including a full sized statue of their ancestor, To Yuan Ming.

Transportation
Lam Tei is reachable by Castle Peak Road. There is also a Light Rail stop, served by routes 610, 614, 615, and 751.

Education
Lam Tei is in Primary One Admission (POA) School Net 70. Within the school net are multiple aided schools (operated independently but funded with government money) and the following government schools: Tuen Mun Government Primary School (屯門官立小學).

See also 
 List of planning areas in Hong Kong 
 Hung Shui Kiu 
 Tuen Mun River 
 Yuen Long Highway 
 Hong Kong–Shenzhen Western Corridor
 Tuen Mun Rural Committee

References

External links 

 Lam Tei Quarry operation, Tuen Mun
 Pictures of the villages of Lam Tei